Kalanthode is a fast-growing rural area near to the National Institute of Technology Calicut, in the Kozhikode district of the Indian state of Kerala.

Nearby Education Institutions
There are many educational institutions there.
 KMCT College of Engineering 
 KMCT Polytechnic college
 KMCT School of Business Management
 KMCT college of Teacher Education
 MES Raja Residential School
 MES Arts and Science college
 Govt Nayarkuzhi School
 Al-Huda English Medium School
 Al-Najath English Medium School

Nearest places
 Mukkam
 Kattangal
 Parathapoyil
 Chathamangalam
 Kunnamangalam
 Koduvally
 Manassery

Universities and colleges in Kozhikode